Urubamba District is one of seven districts of the province Urubamba in Peru.

Geography 
The Urupampa mountain range traverses the district. Other mountains are listed below:

 Aqu Q'asa
 Puka Q'asa
 Pumawank'a
 Qhapaq Saya
 Sut'uq
 Taruka Kancha
 T'uruhana
 Uman Urqu

See also 
 Khichuqaqa

References